Xonox, a division of K-tel Software, was an American third-party manufacturer of cartridges for the Atari 2600, ColecoVision, Commodore 64, and VIC-20 in the early 1980s. Xonox was one of many small video game companies to fold during the Video Game Crash of 1983.

History 
Xonox, based in Minnesota, started developing Atari cartridges during the height of the 2600's popularity. Xonox capitalized on the novelty and perceived value of "double-ender" cartridges. These could be inserted into the console on one of the two ends, each end offering a different game. Different double-ender configurations could package the same game with different counterparts. Xonox was not the first company to try this; Playaround did it earlier with their adult-themed titles. Xonox eventually abandoned this idea and began releasing single versions of some of the titles previously offered as double-enders as well as a few new titles.

Games released

Atari 2600

Standard cartridges 
Artillery Duel
Chuck Norris Superkicks
Ghost Manor
Motocross Racer
Robin Hood
Sir Lancelot
Spike's Peak
Tomarc The Barbarian

Double-enders 
Artillery Duel/Chuck Norris Superkicks
Artillery Duel/Ghost Manor
Artillery Duel/Spike's Peak
Chuck Norris Superkicks/Ghost Manor
Chuck Norris Superkicks/Spike's Peak
Ghost Manor/Spike's Peak
Robin Hood/Sir Lancelot
Motocross Racer/Tomarc the Barbarian

ColecoVision

Standard cartridges 
Artillery Duel
Chuck Norris Superkicks
It's Only Rock n' Roll
Motocross Racer
Robin Hood
Sir Lancelot
 Slurpy
 Tomarc the Barbarian
 Word Feud

Double-enders 
Artillery Duel/Chuck Norris Superkicks
Motocross Racer/Tomarc the Barbarian
Robin Hood/Sir Lancelot

Commodore 64 
Artillery Duel
Chuck Norris Superkicks
Ghost Manor
Motocross Racer
Robin Hood
Sir Lancelot
Spike's Peak
Tomarc the Barbarian

References 

Companies based in Minnesota
Defunct video game companies of the United States
Atari 2600